Nikola Jevtović (born 19 December 1989) is a Serbian professional basketball player for BCM U Pitești of the Liga Națională. Before he joined Piteşti, he had played for BM Slam Ostrów Wielkopolski of the PLK.

References

External links 
 Profile at aba-liga.com
 Profile at eurobasket.com

1989 births
Living people
ABA League players
Basketball League of Serbia players
KK Igokea players
KK Metalac Valjevo players
KK Radnički Kragujevac (2009–2014) players
KK Sloboda Užice players
Serbian expatriate basketball people in Bosnia and Herzegovina
Serbian expatriate basketball people in Romania
Serbian men's basketball players
Sportspeople from Užice
Power forwards (basketball)